The 39th King's Cup finals was held from 21 to 23 January 2009 at the Surakul Stadium in Phuket, Thailand. The King's Cup (คิงส์คัพ) is an annual football tournament; the first tournament was played in 1968.

This edition of the tournament was due to be played at the end of the domestic football season, the Thailand Premier League in October, but was postponed until early 2009 after the Thai national team made other commitments.

The tournament was held in between the 2008 AFF Suzuki Cup and the start of qualification for the AFC Asian Cup.

The format of this tournament had also changed from the previous edition, to a knockout basis, starting from the semi-finals, instead of a round robin group stage.

Participating nations
 Thailand
 Korea DPR
 Lebanon 
 Denmark League XI

Bracket

Matches

Semi finals

3/4 Place Match

Final

Winner

Scorers 

2 goals

 Sutee Suksomkit

1 goal

 Søren Rieks
 Danny Olsen
 Ken Ilsø
 Mahmoud El Ali
 Abbas Ahmed Atwi
 Teerasil Dangda
 Suchao Nutnum

See also
 King's Cup
 Football in Thailand

References

External links 
 RSSSF.com

2009 in Thai football cups
2009